Chris Humphrey (born 1987) is a Jamaican professional footballer.

Chris Humphrey may also refer to:

Chris Humphrey (cricketer) (born 1972), Barbadian cricketer
Chris Humphrey (politician), American politician

See also
Chris Humphries (disambiguation)